The 1938 Iowa Hawkeyes football team represented the University of Iowa in the 1938 Big Ten Conference football season. This was Irl Tubbs' second and final season as head coach of the Hawkeyes.

Schedule

References

Iowa
Iowa Hawkeyes football seasons
Iowa Hawkeyes football